Vanegas is a surname. Notable people with the surname include:

David Vanegas (born 1986), Colombian golfer
Erika Vanegas (born 1988), Mexican footballer
Henry Vanegas (born 1960), Colombian footballer and manager
Mario Vanegas (born 1939), Colombian cyclist
Trent Vanegas (born 1974), American blogger